The Mistress (German: Die Geliebte) is a 1927 German silent drama film directed by Robert Wiene and starring Edda Croy, Harry Liedtke and Eugen Burg. It was based on a play by Alexander Brody. It was the first film Wiene made after returning to Germany after two years working in Austria, although the film's location shooting was done in Vienna, where the story is set. The interiors were shot at the Marienfelde Studios of Terra Film in Berlin.

Cast
 Edda Croy as Anna von Zizka 
 Harry Liedtke as Prinz August 
 Eugen Burg as Vater von Anna 
 Hedwig Pauly-Winterstein as Mutter von Anna 
 Hans Junkermann as Prinz Augusts Vater - der Herzog 
 Adele Sandrock as Die Großmama 
 Paul Heidemann as Der Adjutant 
 Olga Engl   
 Karl Platen

References

Bibliography
 Jung, Uli & Schatzberg, Walter. Beyond Caligari: The Films of Robert Wiene. Berghahn Books, 1999.

External links

Films of the Weimar Republic
1927 films
1927 drama films
German silent feature films
German drama films
Films directed by Robert Wiene
German films based on plays
Films set in the 1910s
Films set in Vienna
Films shot in Vienna
German black-and-white films
Silent drama films
Films shot at Terra Studios
1920s German films
1920s German-language films